Endoclita excrescens is a species of moth of the family Hepialidae. It is known from Japan and the Russian Far East. Food plants for this species include Castanea, Nicotiana, Paulownia, Quercus, and Raphanus. The species is considered a pest of the tobacco plant.

References

External links
Hepialidae genera

Moths described in 1877
Hepialidae
Moths of Japan